The Beck Northeast Site is an archaeological site near Davidsonville in Anne Arundel County, Maryland. This site was discovered in the 1930s and investigations since that time have revealed artifacts dating from the Late Archaic period through the Middle Woodland period.

It was listed on the National Register of Historic Places in 1986.

References

External links
, including photo from 1970, at Maryland Historical Trust

Archaic period in North America
Archaeological sites on the National Register of Historic Places in Maryland
Archaeological sites in Anne Arundel County, Maryland
Native American history of Maryland
Middle Woodland period
National Register of Historic Places in Anne Arundel County, Maryland